Charles Seymour Carr (22 November 1849 – 30 March 1921) was an Australian cricketer. He played one first-class cricket match for Victoria in 1873.

See also
 List of Victoria first-class cricketers

References

External links
 

1849 births
1921 deaths
Australian cricketers
Victoria cricketers
Australian players of Australian rules football
Melbourne Football Club (pre-VFA) players